Bondari Esfahani was a Persian historian and translator of Shahnameh into Arabic. Very little is known about him. Having grown up in Esfahan, he spent most of his life in Iraq and Levant. He presented his translation of Shahnameh to Malek Moazzam in 624 AH. It is known that the name of his father was Abolhasan. It has been suggested that after the death of Malek Moazzam, he returned to Esfahan.

References 

Shahnameh
13th-century Iranian historians
Writers from Isfahan